Dante Vanzeir (born 16 April 1998) is a Belgian professional footballer who plays as a forward and winger for Major League Soccer club New York Red Bulls and the Belgium national team.

Club career

Genk
Vanzeir is a youth exponent from K.R.C. Genk. He started playing in the young sector of Genk when he was eleven.

He made his Belgian Pro League debut on 18 September 2016 in a 0–2 home defeat against R.S.C. Anderlecht. He replaced Leon Bailey after 81 minutes. Vanzeir scored his first goal in the Belgian Pro League on 24 January 2018 in a 2-1 victory against Lokeren.

Loan to Beerschot Wilrijk
For the 2018/19 season he was loaned to Beerschot Wilrijk in the second-tier First Division B.  While  with Beerschot Wilrijk he contributed 16 goals in 39 matches helping his team compete at the top of the division and narrowly missing out on promotion.

Loan to KV Mechelen
For the 2019/20 season Vanzeir was loaned to newly promoted top flight club KV Mechelen. On 20 September 2019 he scored his first two goals for the club in a 2-3 victory against K.V. Kortrijk.

Union SG
On 30 July 2020, Genk announced that they had sold Vanzeir to Royale Union Saint-Gilloise, with whom he signed a contract until the summer of 2023. With Union, he became champion in First Division B on 13 March 2021, with Union returning to the Belgian First Division after 48 years. Vanzeir had a big part in the title win, being the club's top scorer and the joint top scorer of the competition with 19 league goals.

On 25 July 2021, the day of his return to the Jupiler Pro League, Vanzeir provided an assist for the go-ahead goal in the Brussels derby against RSC Anderlecht, which Union eventually won 1–3. Two days later, Vanzeir extended his contract until 2024, with an option for an additional year. On 28 August he scored a hat-trick in the home game against Standard Liège.

New York Red Bulls
On 3 February 2023, New York Red Bulls announced that they had acquired Vanzeir from Royale Union Saint-Gilloise.

International career 
In November 2021, he was called up to the senior Belgium squad for 2022 FIFA World Cup qualification matches, on 13 and 16 November against Estonia and Wales respectively. He made his debut against Wales.

Personal life 
His sister, Luna Vanzeir, is also a football player. She plays for KRC Genk of the Super League.

Career statistics

Club

Honours
Genk
 Belgian Super Cup: 2019
 Belgian Cup runner-up: 2017–18

Union SG
Belgian First Division B: 2020–21

Individual
Belgian Second Division Footballer of the Year: 2020–21
Belgian First Division B top scorer: 2020–21 (joint – 19 goals)

References

External links
 
 

1998 births
Living people
People from Beringen, Belgium
Footballers from Limburg (Belgium)
Belgian footballers
Association football wingers
K.R.C. Genk players
K Beerschot VA players
Royale Union Saint-Gilloise players
Belgian Pro League players
Challenger Pro League players
Belgium youth international footballers
Belgium under-21 international footballers
Belgium international footballers
New York Red Bulls players
Belgian expatriate footballers
Expatriate soccer players in the United States
Belgian expatriate sportspeople in the United States
Designated Players (MLS)